The Library Quarterly is a quarterly double-anonymous peer-reviewed academic journal covering library science, including historical, sociological, statistical, bibliographical, managerial, psychological, and educational aspects of the field. It is  published by the University of Chicago and was established to fill a need for investigation and discussion set forth by the American Library Association in 1926. The editors are Paul T. Jaeger (University of Maryland, College Park), and Natalie Greene Taylor (University of South Florida), with associate editors Jane Garner (Charles Sturt University, Australia) and Shannon M. Oltmann (University of Kentucky).

History
The Library Quarterly was established in January 1931, the year that Lee Pierce Butler joined the University of Chicago Graduate Library School, which was where library science as the academic study of the relationship between books and users was originally conceived. Thus, its publication history parallels the existence of library science as a field of academic research. The emergence of a journal devoted expressly to research in library science was met with conflict in the discipline according to the journal's first editor, William M. Randall. The controversy revolved around whether research and scientific method was needed in the field. The Quarterly continued publication after the Graduate Library School closed in 1989.

Howard W. Winger was managing editor from 1961 through 1972, in 1975, from 1980 through 1985 and from 1988 through 1989. More than 50 of his essays (particularly those on 16th-century printers' devices) appeared in The Library Quarterly. When editorship was taken over by Steven P. Harter in 1990 Winger wrote a history of the journal's editorial boards.
In 2002 editor, John V. Richardson, analyzed the peer review process in place at Library Quarterly. 

A bibliometric analysis in 2006 on the 75th anniversary of the journal found that nearly 50% of the world's most cited library and information scientists were contributors.

Until 2013, the covers of the journal featured emblems from booksellers or printers. Featured in every issue was a study of the particular emblem that focuses on the typographer, dealer, seller, and designer. As of 1975, 176 prints had been displayed on the journal's cover. The University of Florida libraries provide digital access to printers' devices, including those that appeared on the cover of The Library Quarterly.

In 2004 The Library Quarterly went online, adding additional articles, content, and unique supplements. Online features also include most accessed and most cited articles.

A new team of editors, Editorial Board, and a new Reviews Committee were added in 2016.

References

External links 
 
 Index of The Library Quarterly covers, 1931 to date

Quarterly journals
Library science journals
University of Chicago Press academic journals
English-language journals
Publications established in 1931
1931 establishments in Illinois